PM3FHI (105.9 FM), on air name Ardan Radio, is a radio station in Bandung, Indonesia. This radio station mainly plays contemporary hit music (Top 40). In its promotions, Ardan Radio claims as number 1 radio station in Bandung for young audience target.

Jingles
The Ardan Radio Bandung Jingles Throughout the History

Jingles as TM Century
 Ardan Hi-Tech FM 
 105,8 Ardan Bandung 
 It's Ardan Radio Hi-Tech FM In Flower City 
 Everywhere 105,8 Ardan FM 
 You're Feeling 105,8 Ardan Hi-Tech FM
 Ardan Swaratama Hi-Tech FM
 Make It More Than Just Music 105,8 Ardan FM
 Have A Nice Weekend With Ardan FM Bandung
 BIRD 105,8 ARDAN HI-TECH FM
 105,8 Ardan FM
 Ardan Swaratama Bandung
 105,8 Ardan Swaratama Hi-Tech FM
 Information on Ardan FM (News Update Only)

Jingles as Reelworld
 Stay Cool & Lovely 105,9 Ardan FM Bandung
 Stay Cool & Lovely 105,9 Ardan Radio Bandung
 Stay Cool & Lovely, 105,9 Stay Cool & Lovely, Ardan Radio
 105,9 Ardan Radio
 Ardan FM 105,9 Bandung
 Ardan FM 105,9 Stay Cool & Lovely Station
 Stay Cool & Lovely, 105,9 Ardan FM

References

Radio stations in Indonesia